The Altona Football Club is an Australian rules football club which compete in the WRFL  since 1988.
The team is based in the Melbourne suburb of Altona.

History

Altona Football Club was established in 1918 in a Pier Street café by James Duke. Altona's nickname in the 1930s was “The Seagulls” or "The Seadogs". In 1939 Altona changed their Guernseys to Navy Blue with a white "A" on the breast and were known as "The As"
In 1940 Altona struggled to keep a team going due to many players joining the Armed Forces. With 2 games to complete the 1940 W.D.F.L. season, Altona were expelled from the Association due to not fielding a team on 2 occasions. Altona would go into recess from 1941 to 1943. In 1944 a group met at Leo Barnes' shop in Pier Street Altona and formed a committee to resume the football club which would play social matches in  1944. In 1945 Altona entered the Footscray District Football League in B-Grade where they won the 1947 Premiership and were elevated into the A-Grade for seasons 1948 and 1949.

In 1950 Altona did not field a Senior team due to the Werribee Shire unwilling to supply a satisfactory playing area, Altona only ran an Under 18 team in C-Grade of the F.D.F.L.

In 1951 with a new playing area Altona rejoined the B-Grade of the F.D.F.L. where they won the Premiership Flag.

In 1952 the F.D.F.L. made it mandatory that there would only be 1 Senior Grade and that all teams must have an Under 18 side. Altona could not raise an Under 18 side so it joined the Werribee Football League and changed their Guernseys back to purple & gold. Altona played in the W.F.L. from 1952 to 1964 and were finalists every year and winning the 1956 & 1964 Premierships.

In 1965 Altona had 2 Senior sides and Juniors. Due to the W.F.L. only having one Senior Division, Altona joined the strong Metropolitan Football League with 1 Senior side and had its Reserves and Juniors in the Werribee Football League. Altona's Reserves would move to the 2nd Division of the Metro Football League in 1966 and the Juniors played in the Western Suburban Football League which had changed its name from the Werribee Football League on the request of the South Melbourne Football Club whom was sponsoring the League.

In early 1969, Altona Football Club Committee released a statement that due to lack of support and poor finances Altona would not field a Senior side and only field Juniors in the W.S.F.L. Former Altona Shire President, Bill Lee had registered the name "Altona City Football Club" with the W.S.F.L. and this would be the start of a new club which would have all the A.F.C. players, same colours and same ground. 
In 1972 Altona City adopted the nickname "The Vikings" and penned the theme song which would pay homage to the Altona Football Club with the ending chorus of "C'mon the As".
This era would be Altona's most successful winning Senior Premierships in 1970,71,72,73,75 &76.

In 1977 Altona City FC joined the FDFL for 3 seasons.
 
Altona rejoined the WSFL in 1980 winning the Division 2 flag and the 1987 Premiership. Altona City played in the WSFL until 1988 when the WSFL merged with the FDFL.
In 1991 Altona City won the F.D.F.L. A2 Division Premiership which elevated them to the A1 Division in 1992.

At Altona's AGM at the end of 1992, it was voted that Altona City would be named Altona Football Club and all records from both clubs be amalgamated. 
Altona played in the A1 Division until they were relegated back to the A2 Division after the 2003 season. 2004 saw Altona win the A2 Premiership. Instead of taking the elevation into the A1 Division, the thoughts of the club that they were not ready to play in the A1 Division and decided to stay in the A2 Division in 2005 where they won back to back Premierships and were elevated into A1 Division for season 2006. The club rebuilt itself from 2006 and saw some lean years but it paid dividends were Altona won the 2012 A1 Division Premiership.

Team Of The Century 1918 - 2018

Competitions

Y.M.C.A

1921,1924,1925,1927,1928 (5 Seasons)

Sunshine & District Football Association

1922, 1923 (2 Seasons)

Melbourne & Suburbs A-Grade

1926 (1 Season)

V.F.A. Suburban District B Section

1929 (1 Season)

Footscray District Football League / Western Region Football League

1933,34,35,36,37,45,46,47,48,49,51,77,78,79,1988–present (45 Seasons)

Werribee District Football Association / Werribee Football League

1930,31,32,38,39,40,52,53,54,55,56,57,58,59,60,61,62,63,64 (19 Seasons)

Metropolitan Football League

1965,66,67,68 (4 Seasons)

Western Suburban Football League

1969,70,71,72,73,74,75,76,80,81,82,83,84,85,86,87 (16 Seasons)

Premierships Seniors
 W.D.F.L. = 1930, 1932
 W.F.L. = 1956, 1964
 F.D.F.L. & W.R.F.L. = Div 1 = 2012, 2022 Div 2 = 1947, 1951, 1991, 2004, 2005
 W.S.F.L. = 1970, 1971, 1972, 1973, 1975, 1976, 1980, 1987

Premierships Reserves
 W.S.F.L. 1972,1974
 W.R.F.L. Div 2 = 2005,Div 1 = 2012, 2013, 2018, 2019

Premierships U19s
 W.R.F.L. 2017
 W.R.F.L. 2018

Premierships U18s
 W.F.L. 1960,1961,1964
 W.S.F.L. 1966,1967,1968,1970,1971,1984
 W.R.F.L. 2007 Div: 1,2007 Div: 2

Premierships U16s
 W.S.F.L. 1968,1969,1970,1971

Premierships U13s
 W.S.F.L. 1973,1977

Senior Grand Final Results

VFL/AFL players
  Charles McDonald - South Melbourne 1924 - 1928 57 Games  5 goals
  Ted Sivies - South Melbourne 1924 1 game
  Bill Brown - Hawthorn 1926 & 1928  12 Games
  Kevin Rohleder - St.Kilda 1943  5 Games
  Noel Rohleder - South Melbourne 1950  1 Game 1 goal
  Tom Jones - Carlton 1951 - 1952 and Footscray 1953 - 1954  20 Games 10 goals
Stuart Magee - South Melbourne 1962 - 1968 and Footscray 1968 - 1975 216 Games 149 goals
  Geoff Heyme - South Melbourne 1962 - 1963   10 Games
  Graham Page - South Melbourne 1969    1 Game
Robert Saggers - Sydney & North Melbourne 1985 - 1986  5 Games 7 goals
Jayden Post - Richmond 2009 - 2012         30 Games  6 goals

Altona Juniors Football Club
Trent McKenzie - Gold Coast Suns 2011 - 2017, Port Adelaide 2018 -

ALTONA Senior Best & Fairest
 
  MOST BEST & FAIRESTS  
  5) Noel Rohleder 51,59,61,62,64  5) Steve Mandics 75,79,80,82,85  5) Greg Cunningham 87,89,93,94,96  4) Andrew Venner 97,98,99,01  4) Aaron Freeland  05,07,08,09  3) Mal Tisdale  67,71,74   3) Steven Kennedy 13,17,19
 
 1919 Abe Johnson & J.Chandler
 1931 Ben Wohlers
 1938 Kevin Rohleder
 1945 Bernie Brennan
 1946 Ron Douglas
 1947 W."Scud" Thompson
 1949 Chris Birkitt
 1951 Noel Rohleder
 1952 Kevin Ridge
 1953 Bob Blokeerus
 1955 Max Stephens *Max Stephens League B&F
 1958 Wilfred Haigh
 1959 Noel Rohleder
 1961 Noel Rohleder
 1962 Noel Rohleder *Noel Rohleder League B&F
 1963 Mario Piovesan *Mario Povesan League B&F
 1964 Noel Rohleder & Bill Devereaux
 1965 Bill Devereaux
 1966
 1967 Mal Tisdale
 1968 Algie Vosilitis * Algie Vosilitis League B&F
 1969 Graham Brennan
 1970 Stephen Chatfield
 1971 Mal Tisdale
 1972 Martin Crump
 1973 Gary Munro *Ron Schwabe League B&F
 1974 Mal Tisdale
 1975 Steve Mandics
 1976 Danny Brennan
 1977 Geoff Bebend 
 1978 Peter Robertson
 1979 Steve Mandics
 1980 Steve Mandics *Steve Mandics League B&F
 1981 Peter Greenough
 1982 Steve Mandics
 1983 Murray Cooper *Murry Cooper League B&F
 1984 Bradley Scholes
 1985 Steve Mandics
 1986 Colin Ritchie
 1987 Greg Cunningham
 1988 Shane Davis
 1989 Greg Cunningham
 1990 Darren Hyde
 1991 Paul Whybrow
 1992 David Wright
 1993 Greg Cunningham
 1994 Greg Cunningham
 1995 Wayne Muschialli & Scott Evans
 1996 Greg Cunninham
 1997 Andrew Venner
 1998 Andrew Venner *Andrew Venner League B&F
 1999 Andrew Venner *Andrew Venner League B&F
 2000 Scott Evans 
 2001 Andrew Venner *Andrew Venner R/up League B&F
 2002 J.Dorward
 2003 A.McMahon
 2004 S.Smith
 2005 Aaron Freeland & Brett Miller
 2006 J.Magnabosco
 2007 Aaron Freeland
 2008 Aaron Freeland & Brett Shiels
 2009 Aaron Freeland
 2010 Lee Spiteri
 2011 Reece Miles
 2012 Travis Lunardi
 2013 Steven Kennedy
 2014 Daniel O'Leary
 2015 Jayden Post     
 2016 Jordan Robbins
 2017 Steven Kennedy *Steven Kennedy League B&F
 2018 Patrick Rose
 2019 Steven Kennedy
 2021 Luke Whatman
 2022 Joshua Bench  *Joshua Bench 3rd League B&f

ALTONA Reserves Best & Fairest
 MOST BEST & FAIRESTS
 5) Anthony Hodgetts 2001,03,04,05,06  5) Brett Miller 2012,13,14,15,16  3) Darren Hyde 86,97,2002  3) Steve Shiels 91,92,94  3) Glenn Evans 98,99,2000
 
 1965 Ern Gillert
 1966 Lou Thompson
 1967 Kevin Peachey
 1968 John Neal
 1972 Bill Devereaux *Bill Devereaux League B&F
 1974 Geoff Bebend
 1976 Steve Grainger
 1977 Mick Howard
 1978 Gary Nolan
 1986 Darren Hyde
 1990 Paul Nuske
 1991 Steve Shiels
 1992 Steve Shiels
 1993
 1994 Steve Shiels
 1995 Robert Grierson
 1996 Greg Cooney
 1997 Darren Hyde
 1998 Glenn Evans 
 1999 Glenn Evans  *Glenn Evans League B&f
 2000 Glenn Evans 
 2001 Anthony Hodgetts  *Glenn Evans League B&f *Anthony Hodgetts R/up League b&f
 2002 Darren Hyde 
 2003 Anthony Hodgetts
 2004 Anthony Hodgetts 
 2005 Anthony Hodgetts  *Anthony Hodgetts League B&f
 2006 Anthony Hodgetts  *Anthony Hodgetts R/up League B&f 
 2007 Kevin McDonald    *Anthony Hodgetts R/up League B&f
 2008 Kevin McDonald 
 2009 Shaun Hagger
 2010 Allan Casser  *Anthony Hodgetts League B&f  
 2011 Allan Casser 
 2012 Brett Miller  *Brett Miller League b&f 
 2013 Brett Miller  *Brett Miller League B&f
 2014 Brett Miller  *Brett Miller League B&f *Bilal Souki R/up League B&f 
 2015 Brett Miller  *Brett Miller League B&f
 2016 Brett Miller  *Brett Miller League B&f
 2017 Jordan Allen
 2018
 2019 Matthew McCartney
 2021 William Ward
 2022 Matthew McCartney

League Best & Fairest

Seniors

1955 - Max Stephens. 1962 - Noel Rohleder. 1963 - Mario Piovesan. 1968 - Algie Vosilaitis. 1973 - Ron Schwabe. 1980 - Steve Mandics. 1983 - Murray Cooper. 1998 & 1999 - Andrew Venner.  2017 -Steven Kennedy.

Reserves

1972 - Bill Devereaux. 1999 - Glenn Evans. 2001 - Glenn Evans. 2005 - Anthony Hodgetts. 2010 - Anthony Hodgetts. 2012, 2013, 2014, 2015, 2016 - Brett Miller.

Under 19s

2018 - J.Callaway & B.Searle.

Under 18s

1960 - Brian Skinner. 1970 - Steve Chatfield. 1971 - E.Valente 1999 - R.Cassidy. 2007 - M.Hardiman. 2008 - Corey Lawson. 2009 - Alex Vivoda. 2017 Ethan Taylor

Under 17s

1978 - Neil Condon.

Under 16s

1966 - Richard Zapart. 1968 - Steve Chatfield. 1971 - Joc O'Conner.

Under 12s

1977 - Doug Cooper. 1983 - Jason Skinner.

Under 10s

1977 - Andrew Taylor.

References

External links
Official Western Region Football League Website
Official Club Website

Book
History of the WRFL/FDFL – Kevin Hillier - -  
History of football in Melbourne's north west - John Stoward -  

Australian rules football clubs in Melbourne
Australian rules football clubs established in 1918
1918 establishments in Australia
Western Region Football League clubs
Sport in the City of Hobsons Bay